Spot Goes to Hollywood is a platforming video game developed by Eurocom and published by Acclaim Entertainment in North America and Virgin Interactive Entertainment in Europe for the Mega Drive/Genesis as the sequel to Cool Spot. A Sega Saturn and PlayStation version was later released, and featured FMV clips and different levels but similar gameplay to the original version. It utilizes an isometric graphics system to provide a pseudo-3D playing experience. The player controls Spot, once the mascot for the 7 Up soft drink (itself owned by Keurig Dr Pepper), as he travels to various places trying to free his friends. A 32X version of the game was in development but never released.

Description

The central character in the game is Spot. Spot has become trapped in a movie projector. As he jumps from film to film, he encounters many classic film genres; these make up the various levels of the game. In the Sega Genesis/Mega Drive version of the game, the main levels are a pirate movie, a horror movie, an adventure movie, and a sci-fi movie. In the Sega Saturn and PlayStation version of the game, the main levels are a pirate movie, an adventure movie, and a horror movie, but there is also a Western movie, a dinosaur movie, and a sci-fi movie which are unlocked by finding all five stars in each of the game's levels. Finding all the stars also grants a better ending upon the game's completion.

There are red dots scattered around the levels. Collecting 100 of these earns an extra life.

Story (Sega Saturn and PlayStation version)
A bubble goes through Hollywood, which ends up inside a movie theater and pops as it hits a Cool Spot soda vending machine. Cool Spot himself falls out with a can of soda and wanders into the employee room as he starts up a movie projector. As he goes inside he is trapped inside the projector and gets sent into the movies showing on the screen.

The first movie Spot ends up is a pirate movie, as he travels through various pirate ships and even rides on a cannon. He defeats a giant octopus and then finds himself in an adventure movie, where he finds himself on canyons, a minecart ride, a temple and defeats a giant spider along the way. Spot then heads to the last movie, the horror movie, which has Cool Spot heading through a graveyard and a large staircase.

What happens next depends if the player does not get all the hidden stars in every level. If the player does not get them all, the horror movie finishes, Spot's friends cheer for Spot for succeeding through the movies, but Spot notices that the player did not fully complete the game, and so he takes himself back into the movie projector and gets sent to them, again.

If the player does get all the hidden stars in every level, the horror movie's bonus stage sends Spot to space and then the last level; It's full of Stars, where Spot rides a spaceship and fights a giant robot mech. Cool Spot then defeats the mech after a weight falls onto it. Cool Spot manages to free himself from the movies and all his friends cheer. Cool Spot wanders out of the theater, and all the Spots escape along with him because various monsters from the movie want their revenge, and so chase after Cool Spot until the staff credits roll, and escape out the door.

Reception

Writing about the Genesis version, all four of Electronic Gaming Monthlys reviewers were impressed with the graphics and level design, and while one of them felt that the isometric perspective and controls make the game frustrating to the point of being unplayable, the other three felt that the difficulties presented by the perspective and controls actually enhance the experience. A reviewer for Next Generation also considered the graphics impressive and found the isometric perspective presented no difficulty at all due to the "diagonally oriented control method". He nonetheless concluded that "in a final analysis, the game offers only enough excitement to be considered average." GamePro gave it a negative review, complaining of the player character's slowness, the way the isometric perspective makes it difficult to judge where ledges are, the "average at best" graphics, and the poor sound effects.

Though not outright panned, the PlayStation and Saturn versions received more uniformly negative reviews, with critics universally remarking that the isometric perspective makes it hard to judge where objects are and makes the controls confusing on all the possible control configurations. The four reviewers of Electronic Gaming Monthly said that the graphics are enhanced to the point where they are impressive even on the more powerful PlayStation, and were particularly enamored of the cutscenes, but found it hard to enjoy due to the control issues and jerky scrolling. Scary Larry of GamePro was impressed with the graphics, scenery, and audio, but said the control issues make the game "drastically unplayable." Doctor Devon, reviewing the Saturn version for the same magazine, similarly said "It's a shame the charming graphics and sounds are left high and dry by the spotty gameplay." Stephen Fulljames of Sega Saturn Magazine said the game compared well to fellow isometric platformer Sonic 3D Blast in terms of graphics, but not in terms of gameplay. He particularly criticized the completely linear structure of the levels, opining that the consistent goal of moving up and right makes the game monotonous. In contrast to EGM and GamePro, Next Generations reviewer said the PlayStation version showed "no significant upgrades or extras" over the Genesis version. He also criticized the player character's lack of personality, and said the sense of discovery present in the best platformers is absent from the game.

References

External links
Spot Goes to Hollywood at Eurocom

1995 video games
Advergames
Works based on advertisements
PlayStation (console) games
Sega Genesis games
Sega Saturn games
Video games scored by Tommy Tallarico
Video games about food and drink
Video games with isometric graphics
Eurocom games
Single-player video games
Virgin Interactive games
Acclaim Entertainment games
Platform games
Video games developed in the United Kingdom